Aistė Pilvelytė (born 27 July 1979) is a Lithuanian singer.

Biography
Pilvelytė was born to Stasė Pilvelienė and Algirdas Pilvelis. In 1986, she learned choral conducting and pop music at the Balys Dvarionas Music School in the Lithuanian capital, Vilnius. By 1990, she appeared in various singing shows for children. She also sang in the groups Pagalvėlės and Exem. In 1995, she continued her singing lessons with Nijolė Maceikaitė. In the following years she took part in various music competitions in Ireland, Malta, Kazakhstan and Turkey.

In 2006, Pilvelytė won the television show "Lietuvos dainų dešimtukas". In 2008, together with Romas Bubnelis, she won the show "Žvaigždžių duetai 2". She continued to take part in the shows "Duo kartos" and "Delfinai ir žvaigždės".

Participation in the Eurovision Song Contest 
She has competed repeatedly in Lithuania's national selections for the Eurovision Song Contest. After twelve failed attempts, in an interview with a Lithuanian media DELFI in August 2022, she stated: "No matter how old I will be, 50, 60, or 93 – I will go to Eurovision." Her first participation came in 1999, when she placed 11th in the final with the song "Nubudusi širdis". She was set to compete in the country's selection in 2002, but was disqualified for admitted plagiarism of a song by Lara Fabian. She then returned in 2004, placing 12th with the song "Amor (te quiero aqui)", and participated in 2005 and 2006 with the songs "I'll Let You Fly" and "Just for Fun", respectively.

Her first success in the country's selection show came in 2007, when she placed 2nd in the final and subsequently qualified to the superfinal, where she placed 3rd. She then finished in 2nd place in 2008 and 2010 with the songs "Troy On Fire" and "Melancolia". In 2014 she took part in the competition, this time under a talent show format with covers, and was eliminated on the fourth show. 2016 marked her 10th participation: she took part with the song "You Bet", placing 5th. In 2017, she participated with the song "I'm Like a Wolf", placing 2nd for the third time.  She returned to the selection under the revamped format and name Pabandom iš naujo! in 2020 with the song "Unbreakable", placing 5th. In 2023, she participated with the song "We're Not Running" and was eliminated in Heat 1.

Personal life 
Pilvelytė was married to Vladas Motieka from 2005 to 2012. From this marriage, she has a daughter.

At the end of December 2014, the Klaipėda District Court granted Pilvelytė's application to open bankruptcy proceedings. At the beginning of the same year, several of her properties were sold in order to reduce the debt burden that had arisen in the course of the global financial crisis. In June 2019, the Klaipėda District Court announced the conclusion of the case.

Discography 
 Aistė (2000)
 Meilė Dar Gyva (2007)

References 

1979 births
Living people
Lithuanian pop singers
Musicians from Kaunas
20th-century Lithuanian women singers
21st-century Lithuanian women singers